Emelie or Emélie is a feminine given name.

Famous people named Emelie
Emelie Berggren, Swedish ice hockey player
Emelie Forsberg, Swedish trailrunner and ski mountaineer
Emmelie Konradsson, Swedish association football player
Émilie Le Pennec, French gymnast
Emelie Petz, German gymnast
Emélie Polini, UK writer
Emelie Wikström, Swedish alpine skier
Emelie Öhrstig, Swedish cross-country skier
Emelie Obodoakor, Nigerian Actor and Model.
Emelie Ölander, Swedish association football player
Emelie Tracy Y. Swett (1863–1892), American poet, author, editor

See also
Emilia
Emily
Emelie (film), a 2016 horror-thriller film.

Feminine given names